The Albanian Boys, also known as the Albanian Bad Boys or Albanian Boys Inc. was a gang of Albanians who operate in central Bronx. The gang was founded in the Bronx, New York in 1991.

See also
Rudaj Organization
Albanian mafia

Notes

References

School of Social Administration University of Chicago Irving A. Spergel George Herbert Jones Professor. The Youth Gang Problem : A Community Approach: A Community Approach. Oxford University Press, 1995. 

Organizations established in 1988
1988 establishments in New York City
European-American gangs
Gangs in New York City
Albanian-American culture in New York City
Albanian Mafia